Kuselo Moyake (born 7 August 1986) is a South African-born Romanian rugby union player, currently playing with Romanian side Universitatea Cluj. His regular position is flanker. He also plays for Romania's national team, the Oaks, making his international debut during Week 6 of the 2017 end-of-year rugby union internationals in a match against ʻIkale Tahi.

Career

He played for Border Country Districts at the 2004 Craven Week.  He then represented  in the Varsity Cup between 2008 and 2010 and also played for a SK Walmers club side that qualified for the 2013 SARU Community Cup.

He was released by the EP Kings at the end of 2013 and joined Romanian SuperLiga side Baie Mare. He scored one try for them during the 2014 Superliga season to help them win the title. From February 2016 until 2021 Kuselo was part of Steaua București rugby club. He then transferred to Universitatea Cluj-Napoca.

External links

References

Living people
1986 births
South African rugby union players
Romanian rugby union players
Romania international rugby union players
Eastern Province Elephants players
CSM București (rugby union) players
CSA Steaua București (rugby union) players
Rugby union flankers